Ribari may refer to:

 Ribari, Serbia, a village near Šabac, Serbia
 Ribari, Croatia, a village near Karlovac, Croatia
 Ribari, Konjic, a village near Konjic, Bosnia